John Schneider Jr. (August 20, 1918 in Sheboygan, Wisconsin – July 6, 1985) was a member of the Wisconsin State Assembly.

Career
Schneider was a member of the Assembly from 1945 to 1950. He was also a delegate to the 1948 Democratic National Convention.

References

Politicians from Sheboygan, Wisconsin
Democratic Party members of the Wisconsin State Assembly
1918 births
1985 deaths
20th-century American politicians